Jehoiada ( Yəhōyāḏā‘, "Yahweh knows") in the Hebrew Bible, was a prominent priest in the kingdom of Judah during the reigns of Ahaziah (reigned c. 842 - 841 BCE), Athaliah (reigned c. 841–835 BCE), and Joash (reigned c. 836–796 BC). Jehoiada became the brother-in-law of King Ahaziah as a result of his marriage with princess Jehosheba. Both Jehosheba and Ahaziah were children of King Jehoram of Judah (reigned c. 849 – 842 BCE). Ahaziah died a year after assuming the throne, which was then usurped by his mother Athaliah, who ordered the execution of all members of the royal family.

Jehosheba and Jehoiada rescued Athaliah's one-year-old grandson, Joash, from Athaliah's slaughter. For six years, they hid the sole surviving heir to the throne within Solomon's Temple. Jehoiada was instrumental in the staging of a coup d'état which dethroned and killed Athaliah. The account in 2 Chronicles notes the resolve of Jehoiada (Jehoiada strengthened himself in the King James Version, Jehoiada took courage in the English Standard Version, words which do not occur in the parallel passage of ). Athaliah described the coup as an act of treason.

Under Jehoiada's guidance, Baal-worship was renounced and the altar and temple of Baal were destroyed. Jehoiada is also noteworthy for the national covenant that he made "between him, and between all the people, and between the king, that they should be the LORD's people". Jehoiada lived for 130 years and was buried very honorably among the kings in the city of David. Jehoiada's son, Zechariah ben Jehoiada, was later martyred by King Joash.

Priest or High priest?

Josephus mentions Jehoiada as "high priest in his Jewish Antiquities Book 9, Chapter 7," "How Athaliah reigned over Jerusalem for five [six] years, when Jehoiada the high priest slew her." However, Josephus does not mention a Jehoiada in his list of High Priests (10:151-153).

According to the medieval chronicle Seder Olam Zutta (804 CE), Jehoiada was a High priest.

The Book of Chronicles states in 2 Chronicles 24:6  that Jehoiada was the chief priest, another term for high priest.

Patrilineal ancestry
 

Abraham
Isaac
Jacob
Levi
Kohath
Amram
Aaron
Eleazar
Phinehas
Abishua
Bukki
Uzzi
Zerahiah
Meraioth
Amariah
Ahitub
Zadok
Achim
Eliud
Benaiah

References

See also
Bench, Clayton H. The Coup of Jehoiada and the Fall of Athaliah: The Discourses and Textual Production of 2 Kings 11. Piscataway: Gorgias Press, 2016.

9th-century BCE High Priests of Israel
8th-century BCE High Priests of Israel
Regicides
Biblical murderers
Year of birth unknown
Year of death uncertain
Place of birth unknown
Books of Chronicles people